GridSpice is an open source cloud-based simulation package for the smart grid and incorporates code from MATPOWER and GridLAB-D. GridSpice models the interactions between all parts of the electrical grid including generation, transmission, distribution, storage and loads. GridSpace is free software released under the 3-clause BSD license.

See also

 GridLAB-D
 Open energy system models – listing a number of open source electricity and energy system modeling projects

External links
 TomKatCenter at the University of Stanford
 Google Code
 MATPOWER

Free simulation software